Mikiah Kreps (born July 26, 1996) is an American boxer.

She won a medal at the 2019 AIBA Women's World Boxing Championships.

References

1996 births
Living people
American women boxers
Sportspeople from Niagara Falls, New York
AIBA Women's World Boxing Championships medalists
Bantamweight boxers
Boxers from New York (state)
21st-century American women